Pat Durnin (born 4 August 1959) is a Canadian speed skater. She competed in the women's 3000 metres at the 1980 Winter Olympics.

References

External links
 

1959 births
Living people
Canadian female speed skaters
Olympic speed skaters of Canada
Speed skaters at the 1980 Winter Olympics
Speed skaters from Winnipeg
20th-century Canadian women